Oscilloquartz,  a company of ADVA Optical Networking, is a manufacturer of frequency sources, such as GPS& GLONASS receivers or caesium clocks for telecommunications applications and has been producing similar products for about 60 years. It also  providers   synchronization solutions for turnkey synchronization projects in e.g. PDH, SDH, SONET and all kind of mobile telecom networks e.g. GSM, X-CDMA, TETRA, 2.xG, 3G, 4G, UMTS, WiMAX.

It also  offers a wide range of technology, including its proprietary SyncView management software and including, as SyncView agents or embedded solutions, Q3, SNMP, TL1 interfaces.

It also manufactures a  range of products including single oven and double oven oscillators, targeted at the synchronisation of mobile base stations and other telecommunication equipment.
The company headquarters is in Saint-Blaise, Switzerland.

History 
 Oscilloquartz began its operations as a department of Ebauches SA in 1949, during the pioneering days of time and frequency measurement.
 In 1950, Oscilloquartz equipped the Observatory of Neuchâtel where the first quartz clocks were installed. Further quartz clocks were delivered to the Observatory of Paris in 1955.
 In 1958, Oscilloquartz began their activity in atomic frequency standards. An ammoniac maser designed by the LSRH, was built and shown at the Universal Exhibition of Brussels. Subsequently a hydrogen maser was developed and, until 1988, nine units were manufactured and delivered to several observatories and institutes worldwide.
 In 1962, it developed of a complete redundant frequency generating system for Swisscom (formerly named Swiss PTT) of which more than 50 were delivered in the 1960s and 1970s.
 In 1964, it focussed on the field of caesium frequency standards and in 1966 delivered its first commercial atomic clock to the ESRO, the predecessor of the European Space Agency (ESA).
 In 1967, The Swiss atomic clock "OSCILLATOM" was shown at Expo 67, Montreal. During that same year, transport and transfer of precise time was carried out in the United States, Canada, Far East and South America.
 In 1971, Oscilloquartz SA was officially registered as a corporation.
 In 1978, Swisscom (formerly Swiss PTT) commissioned Oscilloquartz to supply a new generation of plesiochronous and synchronous equipment for hierarchy levels I and II of their digital communications network. Over thirty similar synchronization systems were subsequently installed worldwide.
 In 1988, In a joint venture with SERCEL, France, Oscilloquartz developed the new European Digital Caesium Standard, EUDICS, with fully digital control loops and remote capabilities via RS-232 interface.
 In 2014, ADVA Optical Networking acquired Oscilloquartz SA from the Swatch Group.

References

Manufacturing companies of Switzerland